Purple squirrel is a term used by employment recruiters to describe a job candidate with precisely the right education, set of experience, and range of qualifications that perfectly fits a job's requirements. The implication is that over-specification of the requirements makes a perfect candidate as hard to find as a purple squirrel.

While in theory, this prized "purple squirrel" could immediately handle all the expansive variety of responsibilities of a job description with no training, and would allow businesses to function  with fewer workers, it is commonly asserted that the effort seeking them is often wasted. and that being more open to candidates that don't have all the skills, or retraining existing employees, are sensible alternatives to an over-long search.

Origin and history
While it is unclear when exactly the term was coined, it was in use by 2000, and in 2010 CBS published material using the term, writing that "businesses are looking to do more with fewer workers, so they want [purple squirrels] who are able to take on a wide range of duties." In 2012, Google recruiter Michael B. Junge published a popular job search and career book Purple Squirrel: Stand Out, Land Interviews, and Master the Modern Job Market, which helped popularize the term. Elon Musk tweeted in 2012, "Do not search for purple squirrels! Giving them attention only makes them want to be more purple." which is likely also a reference to this term.

See also

Sourcing (personnel)
Employee referral
Perfect is the enemy of good
Reserve army of labour

References

Neologisms
Recruitment
Metaphors referring to animals